This is a list of notable Spanish restaurants. Spanish restaurants typically specialize in Spanish cuisine.

Spanish restaurants
 Andanada, New York City
 Ataula, Portland, Oregon
 Churromania
 Columbia Restaurant
 El Faro Restaurant
 El Quijote
 El Willy
 Masia, Portland, Oregon
 Sant Pau
 Terra Plata, Seattle
 Toro Bravo, Portland, Oregon

See also
 List of Spanish dishes

Lists of ethnic restaurants
 
Restaurants